Bichhiya is a village and corresponding community development block in Unnao district of Uttar Pradesh, India. Located about 16 km southeast of Unnao on the main road to Purwa, it also serves as the seat of a nyaya panchayat and has an Ayurvedic dispensary, a veterinary hospital, an artificial insemination centre, and a family planning centre. The main crops are wheat, gram, barley, juwar, and paddy, and irrigation is largely provided by canal. As of 2011, the village's population is 2,347, in 482 households.

Bichhiya block was first inaugurated on 2 October 1956 in order to oversee implementation of India's Five-Year Plans at a local and rural level. It is part of the tehsil of Unnao.

Villages 
Bichhiya CD block has the following 85 villages:

References

Villages in Unnao district
Community development blocks in India